José Antonio Arbesú Fraga (21 June 1940 – September 26, 2020) was a Cuban diplomat.  Arbesu was born in Havana, and served as the chief of the Cuban Interests Section in Washington, D.C., from 1989 to 1992.

References

Ambassadors of Cuba to the United States
Cuban communists
2020 deaths
Cuban diplomats
1940 births
Deaths from cancer in Cuba